ONS 5 was the 5th of the numbered ONS series of Slow trade convoys Outbound from the British Isles to North America. The North Atlantic battle surrounding it in May 1943 is regarded as the turning point of the Battle of the Atlantic in World War II.
The battle ebbed and flowed over a period of a week, and involved more than 50 Allied ships and their escorts, and over 30 U-boats. It saw heavy losses on both sides.
However it was almost the last Allied convoy to do so, while losses inflicted on attacking U-boats and U-boat groups became a besetting feature of the campaign;
As such it is seen as the point when the tactical and strategic advantage passed to the Allies, and ushered in the period known to Nazi Germany's Kriegsmarine as Black May.

Background
ONS 5 consisted of 43 ships bound from Liverpool to Halifax. The ships were either in ballast or carrying trade and export goods.
The convoy departed Liverpool on 21 April 1943, and would arrive in Halifax three weeks later on 12 May.
It was under the command of JK Brook RNR as Convoy Commodore, travelling in the Norwegian freighter Rena.
The escort was provided by Mid-Ocean Escort Force group B7, 7 warships under Captain Peter Gretton, in the destroyer Duncan. Also in the group were the destroyer Vidette, frigate Tay, and corvettes Sunflower, Snowflake, Loosestrife, and Pink. The group also contained 2 trawlers, Northern Gem and Northern Spray as rescue ships, and the fleet oiler British Lady for mid-ocean re-fuelling. The convoy was joined by other escort vessels as the battle progressed.

ONS 5 was just one of the allied convoys at sea at the end of April; also in the Western Approaches were ON 180, just leaving, and HX 234, just arriving.
Approaching the Americas were ONS 4 and ON 179; departing was SC 128, while in mid-Atlantic, due to pass ONS 5 east of Greenland, was SC 127. Two other east-bound convoys, HX 235 and HX 236, were also in mid-Atlantic, following a southerly route.
This accounted for over 350 ships on the move in the north Atlantic at that time.

Ranged against them were 58 U-boats in 3 patrol lines; Specht (Woodpecker) with 17 boats south of Greenland on the western side of the Air Gap; Meise (Bluetit) with 30 boats east of Greenland covering the northern route, and Amsel (Blackbird) with 11 boats, south of Meise covering the southern route.

Meise had been deployed to catch SC 127, which had been identified by B-Dienst, but on 26 April SC 127 had slipped through a gap in the line and escaped undetected. Realizing what had happened on 27 April, and aware that a slow west-bound convoy was imminent,
Meise was re-configured; the easternmost boats (16 in all) formed the patrol line Star (Starling) to intercept it.
At 8am on 28 April U-650 sighted ONS 5, and group Star quickly gathered for the attack.

Ships involved

ONS 5 comprised 42 ships and 16 escorts, (though not all were present at the same time); 13 ships were lost in the course of the 7 day engagement.

Wolfpacks Star and Finke comprised 43 U-boats (though again, not all had been in contact throughout); 6 of these were lost.

Action
Merchant ships departing Liverpool on 21 April 1943 were met by Escort Group B7 at 1400 on the 22nd; and the convoy formed up in high winds and a heavy sea. At 2200, the Polish freighter Modlin had to turn back with engine trouble. Station-keeping for the remaining ships became increasingly difficult as weather worsened on the 23rd.

24 April
At 1655 on the 24th, in a moderate gale, Flying Fortress C of 206 Squadron RAF from Benbecula, dropped six depth charges on the swirl of a diving U-boat. Fortress D found  on the surface less than an hour later and sank it with depth charges as the U-boat attempted to fight back rather than submerge. U-710 was just  ahead of the convoy, though probably unaware of its proximity.

25–27 April
Freighters Bornholm and Berkel collided on the evening of the 25th as a moderate west-northwest gale reduced convoy speed to two or three knots. Bornholm began taking on water and left the convoy on the 26th attempting to reach Iceland. Vidette joined the convoy with three merchant ships from Iceland on the 26th while rescue trawler Northern Spray was standing by the straggling freighter Penhale until the straggler was ordered into Reykjavík so the trawler could rejoin the convoy. At noon on the 26th, BdU changed the Enigma machine cypher being used to transmit instructions to the U-boats. Allied intelligence services were unable to decrypt message traffic until the afternoon of 5 May.  The weather moderated enough for Duncan, Vidette and Loosestrife to refuel from the escort oiler British Lady on the 27th and a salvage tug from Iceland rescued Bornholm that evening.

Battle of 28–29 April
On the 28th ONS 5 arrived at the Star patrol area, and was sighted at 0900 by U-650. U-650 held contact despite being forced to dive three times to avoid approaching aircraft at 1014, 1150 and 1518. By nightfall U-650 had been joined by U-375, U-386, U-528 and U-537. The U-boats' contact reports alerted Commander Gretton to the presence of U-boats on the convoy's port bow, beam, and quarter and astern. Duncan and Tay made an unsuccessful depth charge attack after sighting a U-boat on the port bow at 1830.

Gretton mounted a vigorous defence as the U-boats attacked after dark. Duncan dropped a pattern of ten depth charges; and, while turning for another attack, gained another radar contact. Duncan gained a good ASDIC contact and dropped a pattern of ten depth charges over a visible wake. Two more depth charges were dropped when a weak ASDIC contact was regained at 0045. U-532 launched six torpedoes. A short time later Tay dropped depth charges on a good ASDIC contact astern of the convoy. U-532 returned to base to repair depth charge damage. U-386 and U-528, were also damaged by these attacks and forced to return to base. U-386 arrived safely at St Nazaire on 11 May, but U-528 was attacked in the Bay of Biscay and sunk by aircraft on the same day.

U-258 and U-650 maintained contact through the night, and U-258 was submerged ahead on the convoy at dawn on the 29th. As the convoy passed overhead at 0530, U-258 rose to periscope depth and launched two torpedoes at McKeesport. After one torpedo hit McKeesport on the starboard bow, Northern Gem detected U-258 and dropped three depth charges. McKeesport was abandoned and sunk by the escort to prevent discovery of classified documents by German boarders. Northern Gem rescued all but one of the crew. U-258 had also been damaged, and was forced to return to base. The Admiralty arranged reinforcements for ONS 5 in response to this battle. HMS Oribi was detached from SC127, and destroyers  Penn, Panther, Impulsive, and  Offa, of the 3rd Support Group under Capt. J.M. McCoy, RN, sailed from Newfoundland. Weather rapidly deteriorated, and the convoy was sailing into a full gale by late afternoon of the 29th. About 1700 Sunflower was struck by a wave which filled the crow's nest with water. Oribi was slowed to 11 knots by the storm, but joined the convoy at 2300 as Tay was attacking a U-boat astern.

30 April
ONS 5 found itself making less than 3 knots headway into a Force 10 gale. The convoy started to be scattered, some ships ending up 30 miles from the convoy, and the escorts were kept busy rounding up stragglers. Oribi was able to refuel from the convoy oiler when the storm abated briefly on the 30th before the weather again made re-fuelling impossible, and a number of the destroyers became so low on fuel as to throw doubt on whether they could continue. The escorts dropped some random depth charges until dawn, and Admiral Dönitz cancelled the chase on the evening of 1 May.

Regrouping 1–3 May
On 1 May Dönitz ordered boats from Star and Specht, with some newcomers to form a new patrol line to the west. This was group Finke (Finch) which was in place on 3 May numbering 27 boats, and tasked with intercepting westbound convoy SC128. The 3rd Support Group destroyers joined the convoy at 0100 2 May, but the fuel situation aboard destroyers became increasingly desperate as weather and frequent course adjustments to avoid icebergs prevented refuelling. At 1400 on the 3rd Gretton was forced to take Duncan to St John's at economical speed (8 knots); and he arrived there with only 4 percent fuel remaining. In Gretton's absence, command was assumed by Lt-Cdr RE Sherwood, of HMS Tay. The SONAR set aboard Tay failed just as Sherwood assumed command of the escort group. Impulsive also detached to Iceland at 1900 3 May, with Northern Gem carrying the survivors from McKeesport, while Penn and Panther detached for Newfoundland at 0600 4 May.

4 May
By 4 May the weather had abated to Force 6, and ONS 5 was now making up to 6 knots, though reduced to 30 ships and 7 escorts.
The rest were scattered and proceeding independently, including a group of four with Pink, trailing some 80 miles behind the main body. The 1st Support Group sailed from Newfoundland at midday with frigates Wear, Jed, Spey and sloops Pelican and Sennen to replace Oribi and Offa whose fuel state would become critical on the 5th. U-628 of group Finke, assembled to catch convoy SC 128, sighted convoy ONS 5 at 2018. Two of the gathering group Finke U-boats were attacked by RCAF Cansos in separate incidents. One thought to have been U-630 was sunk; but is now believed to have been U-209, which was damaged in an attack by Canso W, and foundered later while attempting to return to base. The other, U-438, was only slightly damaged in attacks by Canso E.

Vidette punished U-514 with a pattern of 14 depth charges causing damage putting U-514 out of the battle until 7 May. North Britain was straggling  astern of the convoy, and sank within two minutes of being torpedoed by U-707 at 2237.

5 May
U-264 and U-628 each launched five torpedoes shortly after midnight. Harbury was hit at 0046; Harperly was hit by two torpedoes at 0104; and West Maximus was hit by one torpedo at 0103, another at 0110, and a third at 0135. Both U-boats claimed three ships; but modern historians credit the first freighter to U-628 and the other two to U-264.  One of the torpedoes passed within  of Snowflake. At 0122 Snowflake started closing a radar contact illuminated by star shells fired by Oribi; and both ships dropped depth charges. The gunfire encouraged U-264 to dive, and the depth charges forced U-270 to return to base. U-358 torpedoed Bristol City at 0225, and Wentworth at 0230.  At dawn, Lorient was missing from the convoy. No witnesses to her destruction survived the battle. Before U-125 was sunk, she sent a radio report about sinking a steamship sailing independently; and modern historians assume Lorient straggled from the convoy and was torpedoed by U-125.

Northern Spray picked up 143 survivors from North Britain, Harbury, Harperly, and West Maximus by 0700 and was detached to take the rescued men to Newfoundland. Loosestrife assumed the role of rescue ship and picked up the survivors from Bristol City and Wentworth. U-223, U-231, U-621, and U-634 dived as Oribi approached. Oribi dropped 14 depth charges after the U-boats dived. U-638 torpedoed Dolius at 1240. Sunflower gained an ASDIC contact at  within minutes and destroyed U-638 with a pattern of ten depth charges before rescuing survivors from Dolius. Tay, Oribi, and Offa refueled from convoy oilers that afternoon. Selvistan, Gharinda, and Bonde were hit by a salvo of four torpedoes from U-266 within the space of a few minutes about 1950. Selvistan and Bonde sank within two minutes. Tay rescued survivors from the three ships while Offa made depth charge attacks damaging U-266, which was sunk by aircraft on 15 May while attempting to reach base for repairs.

At midday, Pink commanded by Lieutenant Atkinson made a firm ASDIC contact  ahead of her small convoy proceeding separately. Pink spent 90 minutes making five depth charge and hedgehog attacks. Pink received post-war credit for destruction of U-192; but later analysis concluded the victim, U-358, returned to base after being damaged. U-584 torpedoed West Makadet while Pink was attacking U-358. Pink rescued the survivors.

Night of 5–6 May
As May 5 faded into darkness, Tay counted seven U-boats surfaced in the convoy's path; but ONS 5 was entering the fog formed where the warm Gulf Stream meets the cold Labrador Current off the Grand Banks of Newfoundland. British centimetric radar enabled the escorts to see while the U-boats could not. Many of the U-boats involved never returned to base to file their reports; so historians still struggle to correlate individual reports of the dozens of ships interacting briefly in no fewer than 24 attempted attacks on the night of 5/6 May.

Historians suggest the first attack destroyed U-531.

The U-boat turned away when the range reached  and fired two torpedoes at Loosestrife from its stern tubes while diving. Loosestrife dropped a pattern of ten depth charges as it overran the diving U-boat. A reported slick of oil and debris is believed to have been produced by destruction of U-192.

At 0252 Oribi collided with U-125 first seen at a range of  while investigating an ASDIC contact, but lost contact after the collision. The escorts chose to continue protective patrolling around the convoy rather than attempting rescue of the U-boat crew assumed to have sunk the Lorient.

Historians suggest this attack destroyed U-630.

Sunflower rammed U-533 and dropped two depth charges as U-533 attempted to dive. Both Loosestrife and U-533 were able to repair damage and remain at sea.

Historians suggest these attacks destroyed U-438.

Finke had already outlasted its usefulness, and faced mounting losses if the attack continued. Realizing his mistake, Dönitz called off the assault on 6 May and ordered Finke to retire.

Conclusion

In the course of a week, ONS 5 had been the subject of attacks by a force of over 40 U-boats.
With the loss of 13 ships totalling 63,000 tons, the escorts had inflicted the loss of 6 U-boats, and serious damage on 7 more.

This battle demonstrated that the convoy escorts had mastered the art of convoy protection; the weapons and expertise at their disposal meant that henceforth they would be able not only to protect their charges and repel attack, but also to inflict significant losses on the attacker.

ONS 5 marked the turning point in the battle of the Atlantic. Following this action, the Allies inflicted a series of defeats and heavy losses on the U-boat Arm, a period known as Black May. This culminated in Dönitz withdrawing his forces from the North Atlantic arena.

The official historian, Stephen Roskill commented:
"This seven day battle, fought against thirty U-boats, is marked only by latitude and longitude, and has no name by which it will be remembered; but it was, in its own way, as decisive as Quiberon Bay or the Nile."

Losses

Allied ships lost

U-boats lost

See also
 Convoy Battles of World War II

Notes

References
 Michael Gannon : Black May  ( 1998).  
 Peter Gretton : Convoy Escort Commander  (1964). ISBN (none)
 Arnold Hague : The Allied Convoy System 1939–1945 (2000).  (Canada);  (UK).
 Paul Kemp  : U-Boats Destroyed  ( 1997) . 
 Axel Niestle  : German U-Boat Losses during World War II  (1998). 
 Stephen Roskill : The War at Sea 1939–1945   Vol II (1956). ISBN (none)
 Ronald Seth : The Fiercest Battle  (1961). ISBN (none)
 Dan van der Vat : The Atlantic Campaign (1988).

External links
 ONS 5 at convoyweb
 Convoi ONS 5 at warsailors
 ONS-5 - 28 Apr 1943 – 6 May 1943
 Timeline of Battle of the Atlantic 1943-45

ONS05
Naval battles of World War II involving Canada
C